M O P 223-C was a  suction hopper dredger that was built in 1946 by William Simons & Co Ltd, Renfrew, United Kingdom as Empire Forager for the Ministry of War Transport (MoWT). She was sold in 1949 to the Argentinian Government and renamed M O P 229-C. She was renamed La Descanisada later that year and then renamed M O P 223-C in 1958, serving until she was scrapped in 1976.

Description

The engines were built by William Simons & Co. Ltd. Each engine drove a single screw propeller.

History
The ship was built in 1941 by William Simons & Co. Ltd., Renfrew, United Kingdom. She was yard number 767. She was launched on 19 March 1946 and completed in April. Her port of registry was Greenock. The Code Letters GKLN and United Kingdom Official Number 169468 were allocated. Empire Forager was operated under the management of H. Abram Ltd.

In 1949, Empire Forager was sold to the Argentinian Government and was renamed M O P 229-C. Her port of registry was Buenos Aires. She was operated by the Ministry of Public Works. Later that year, she was renamed La Descanisada. She was renamed M O P 223-C in 1958. With the introduction of IMO Numbers in the 1960s, M O P 223-C was allocated the number 5215818. She served until 1976 when she was scrapped.

References

1946 ships
Ships built on the River Clyde
Empire ships
Ministry of War Transport ships
Steamships of the United Kingdom
Merchant ships of the United Kingdom
Dredgers
Steamships of Argentina
Merchant ships of Argentina